Erode (Tamil: ஈரோடு), is a city in the Indian state of Tamil Nadu.

Erode may also refer to:
 Erode district, one of the 38 districts in the state of Tamil Nadu
 Erode Mahesh, an Indian actor
 Erode (Lok Sabha constituency), a Lok Sabha constituency.
 Erode Nagaraj,  a professional musician
 Erode block, a revenue block
 Erosion
 "Erode", by Dir En Grey from Missa, 1997
 "Erode", by Neurosis from A Sun That Never Sets, 2001